Salihović is a Bosniak surname meaning "son of Salih". Notable people with the surname include:
Admir Salihović (born 1989), Bosnian Canadian footballer
Eldar Salihović (born 1999),  Montenegrin alpine skier
Fuad Salihović (born 1985), Serbian footballer
Jasmin Salihović (born 1980), Bosnian retired middle-distance runner
Sejad Salihović (born 1984), Bosnian footballer

Bosnian surnames
Patronymic surnames
Surnames from given names